Hypnos is the personification of sleep in Greek mythology.

Hypnos may also refer to:

 Hypnos (fish), a genus of electric rays in the family Torpedinidae
 "Hypnos" (short story), a short story by H. P. Lovecraft
 Hypno, a Pokémon
 Hypnos T-type Tyrant, an enemy in the video game Resident Evil Survivor
 Hypnos (record label), an independent record label
14827 Hypnos, an asteroid
Citroën Hypnos, a concept car
Hypnos (band), a Czech death metal band